Benjamin Garrett, better known by his stage name Fryars (sometimes stylised frYars), is an English art pop musician from London.

Career
Fryars released his debut EP, The Ides, in September 2007, and was profiled as The Guardians "New band of the week" in November. A second EP, The Perfidy, followed in March 2008. His debut album, Dark Young Hearts, was released in September 2009; its first single, "Visitors", features backing vocals from Dave Gahan of Depeche Mode. In October 2012, Fryars issued the song "Love So Cold" online as a free download, followed by the EP In My Arms in January 2013 via 679 Recordings.

In October 2013, 679 released Fryars' EP Radio PWR, which was accompanied by a series of live shows devised with magician Simon Drake. Fryars' second album, Power''', which he produced with Luke Smith (formerly of the band Clor) and Rodaidh McDonald, was released in November 2014 through Fiction Records. It followed a lengthy period of what he referred to as "record label limbo", during which he was released from 679 amid the acquisition of parent company Warner Music Group by Access Industries. He described the album as "a soundtrack to a film that does not exist", and released a "B-movie" in the form of an accompanying mixtape titled The Boy in the Hood, as well as developing social media profiles for its characters. Power received positive reviews from Dazed & Confused, The Guardian, and NME.

Fryars' musical influences include David Bowie, Serge Gainsbourg, Kraftwerk, and The Strokes. As a songwriter and producer for other artists, he has contributed to albums including Mika's The Origin of Love (2012), Lily Allen's Sheezus (2014), and Rae Morris's Unguarded (2015); he was additionally featured on Morris's 2014 single "Cold". They entered a relationship during their collaboration on Unguarded.

He co-wrote the song "Johanna" with Miles Kane and Mark Ronson for the film Mortdecai (2015). Fryars is affiliated with Universal Music Publishing Group.
He released a new album in 2021 titled God Melodies.

Discography

Studio albums
Dark Young Hearts (2009)
Power (2014)
God Melodies (2021)

Extended plays
The Ides (2007)
The Perfidy (2008)
In My Arms (2013)
Radio PWR (2013)

Mixtapes
The Boy in the Hood (2014)

Singles
"The Ides" (2009)
"Olive Eyes" (2009)
"Visitors" (2009)
"Love So Cold" (2012)
"In My Arms" (2013)
"On Your Own" (2013)
"Cool Like Me" (2013)
"The Power" (2013)
"Prettiest Ones Fly Highest" (2014)

Remixes
Love Is All – "Felt Tip" (2009)
Pacific – "Sunset Blvd" (2009)
OneRepublic – "If I Lose Myself" (2013)
alt-J – "Dissolve Me" (2013)
Local Natives – "Heavy Feet" (2013)
Fyfe – "Conversations" (2013)
Josh Record – "Bones" (2013)
Swim Deep – "King City" (2013)
The 1975 – "Robbers" (2014)
Seinabo Sey – "Hard Time" (2014)
Lucy Rose - "Second Chance" (2018)

Personal life 
Fryars is married to the pop star Rae Morris.

References

External links
 

21st-century English musicians
679 Artists artists
English electronic musicians
English male singers
English pop singers
English record producers
English songwriters
Living people
Musicians from London
Polydor Records artists
Fiction Records artists
21st-century British male musicians
Year of birth missing (living people)
British male songwriters